In the Catholic Church, a basilica is a designation given by the Pope to a church building, conferring special privileges. Basilicas are distinguished for ceremonial purposes from other churches. The building need not be a basilica in the architectural sense (a rectangular building with a central nave flanked by two or more longitudinal aisles). Basilicas are either major basilicas – of which there are four, all in the Diocese of Rome – or minor basilicas, of which there were 1,810 worldwide .

Numerous basilicas are notable shrines, often even receiving significant pilgrimages, especially among the many that were built above a confessio or the burial place of a martyr – although this term now usually designates a space before the high altar that is sunk lower than the main floor level (as in the case in St Peter's and St John Lateran in Rome) and that offer more immediate access to the burial places below. Some Catholic basilicas are Catholic pilgrimage sites, receiving tens of millions of visitors per year. 

Churches designated as papal basilicas, in particular, possess a papal throne and a papal high altar, at which no one may celebrate Mass without the pope's permission.

Ranking of churches 

The papal or major basilicas outrank in precedence all other churches. Other rankings put the cathedral (or co-cathedral) of a bishop ahead of all other churches in the same diocese, even if they have the title of minor basilica. If the cathedral is that of a suffragan diocese, it yields precedence to the cathedral of the  metropolitan see. The cathedral of a primate is considered to rank higher than that of other metropolitan(s) in his circonscription (usually a present or historical state). Other classifications of churches include  collegiate churches, which may or may not also be minor basilicas. 

The distinction between major basilicas and minor basilicas appears to have arisen in the early eighteenth century. The earliest document that records the use of the term "major basilica" dates from 1727.Sergio Bianchi, Le Basiliche Minori (Rome: Marianum 1976), 2.

Major and papal basilicas 
To the category "Major basilica" belong only the four great churches of Rome, which among other distinctions have a special "holy door" and to which a visit is always prescribed as one of the conditions for gaining the Roman Jubilee. Only the major basilicas may prefix their titles with the adjective sacrosancta (most holy). 

 St. John Lateran, also called the Lateran Basilica. Since it is the cathedral of the Diocese of Rome, in the tradition of the Catholic Church, it has claims as the Mother Church of the world. For this reason, St John Lateran is the only church that is also known as an "archbasilica".
 St. Peter's Basilica, also called the Vatican Basilica, is a major pilgrimage site, built over the burial place of Saint Peter.
 St. Paul Outside the Walls, also known as the Ostian Basilica because it is situated on the road that led to Ostia, is built over the burial place of Paul the Apostle.
 St. Mary Major, also called the Liberian Basilica because the original building (not the present one) was attributed to Pope Liberius, is the largest church in Rome dedicated to the Virgin Mary.

The four major basilicas, together with the minor basilica of St Lawrence Outside-the-Walls, were formerly known as "Patriarchal basilicas" as they were associated with the five ancient patriarchal sees of Christendom (see Pentarchy). Upon relinquishing the title of Patriarch of the West in 2006, Pope Benedict XVI renamed these basilicas from "Patriarchal basilicas" to "Papal basilicas". 

 St. John Lateran was associated with the Pope, the Bishop of Rome and the Patriarch of the West.
 St. Peter's Basilica was associated with the Patriarch of Constantinople.
 St. Paul Outside the Walls was associated with the Patriarch of Alexandria.
 St. Mary Major was associated with the Patriarch of Antioch.
 St. Lawrence Outside the Walls was associated with the Patriarch of Jerusalem.

Nominally, the respective patriarchs could avail of accommodation attached to the basilicas should they have business in Rome.Dictionnaire de droit canonique, vol. 2, s.v. "basilique," p. 242 (1937). These assignments, however, are now purely historical. In some cases, more than one patriarch holds the title for the same patriarchate. For example, each of the Catholic patriarchs of the Melkite, Maronite and Syrian rites holds the title of "Patriarch of Antioch".

Gallery of major basilicas

Minor basilicas 
The privileges attached to the status of minor basilica, which is conferred by papal brief, include a certain precedence before other churches, the right of the conopaeum (a baldachin resembling an umbrella; also called umbraculum, ombrellino, papilio, sinicchio, etc.) and the bell (tintinnabulum), which are carried side by side in procession at the head of the clergy on state occasions, and the cappa magna which is worn by the canons or secular members of the collegiate chapter when assisting at the Divine Office. In the case of major basilicas these umbraculae are made of cloth of gold and red velvet, while those of minor basilicas are made of yellow and red silk – the colors traditionally associated with both the Papal See and the city of Rome.

Regarding minor basilicas the terms "papal minor basilica", "pontifical minor basilica" and "patriarchal minor basilica" are also in use.

Papal minor basilicas
There are three papal minor basilicas, one in Rome,  Basilica of St Lawrence Outside-the-Walls, and two in Assisi associated with Saint Francis of Assisi situated in or near his home town. Architecturally, the Papal Basilica of St Francis of Assisi is an aisleless nave with lateral chapels.

Pontifical minor basilicas
There are five pontifical minor basilicas in the world (the word "pontifical" referring to the title "pontiff" of a bishop, and more particularly of the Bishop of Rome):

 Pontifical Basilica of Our Lady of the Rosary, Pompei
 Pontifical Basilica of St Nicholas, Bari
 Pontifical Basilica of St Anthony, Padua
 Pontifical Basilica of the Holy House, Loreto
 Pontifical Basilica of St Michael, Madrid

Patriarchal minor basilicas
The description patriarchal applies to two minor basilicas associated with archbishops who have the title of patriarch: Patriarchal Cathedral Basilica of St Mark in Venice and the Patriarchal Basilica of Aquileia.

Not all patriarchal cathedrals are minor basilicas, notably: the Patriarchal Cathedral of St Mary Major in Lisbon, Portugal, and the Patriarchal Cathedral of Santa Catarina, Old Goa, India are not.

Basilicas and pilgrimages 

In recent times, the title of minor basilica has been attributed to important pilgrimage churches. In 1999 Bishop Francesco Giogia stated that the Basilica of Our Lady of Guadalupe in Mexico City (constructed in the 20th century) was the most visited Catholic shrine in the world, followed by San Giovanni Rotondo and Basilica of the National Shrine of Our Lady of Aparecida in Brazil. Millions of pilgrims visit the shrines of Our Lady of Lourdes and Our Lady of Fatima. Pilgrimage basilicas continue to attract well over 30 million pilgrims per year. Ireland contains two pilgrimage basilicas: Knock Shrine and St Patrick's Purgatory (Lough Derg).

Every year, on 13 May and 13 October, the significant dates of the Fatima apparitions, pilgrims fill the country road that leads to the Sanctuary of Our Lady of Fátima with crowds that approach one million on each day. In December 2009 the Basilica of Our Lady of Guadalupe set a new record with 6.1 million pilgrims during Friday and Saturday for the anniversary of Our Lady of Guadalupe.

Ecclesiastical basilicas by region 
, there are 1,814 Roman Catholic churches that bear the title of basilica.

St. Mary's Cathedral in Ernakulam, India is the Episcopal See of the Syro-Malabar Catholic Church. The cathedral was elevated to the status of basilica by Pope Paul VI on 20 March 1974. St. George Forane Church in Angamaly, also of the Syro-Malabar rite, was raised to the status of basilica on 24 June 2009 by Pope Benedict XVI.

On 10 May 1997 Pope John Paul II visited the Basilica of Our Lady of Lebanon in Harissa, Lebanon. The basilica is under the Maronite Catholic Patriarchate. The Basilica and National Shrine of Our Lady of Lebanon in North Jackson, Ohio, USA is under the jurisdiction of the Eparchy of Our Lady of Lebanon. The shrine was elevated to the status of a minor basilica by Pope Francis on 8 July 2014.

Gallery of minor basilicas around the world

See also 
 Architecture of cathedrals and great churches
 Catholic Marian church buildings
 Duomo
 List of Catholic basilicas

References

External links 

 
 List of All Major, Patriarchal and Minor Basilicas & statistics by Giga-Catholic Information

Basilicas (Catholic Church)
Catholic church buildings by type